Kudan is a Local Government Area in Kaduna State, Nigeria. Its headquarters are in the town of Hunkuyi. The Local Government Council is chaired by Shuaibu Jaja.

It has an area of 400 km and a population of 138,992 at the 2006 census.

The postal code of the area is 812.

References

Local Government Areas in Kaduna State